Ede North is a Local Government Area in Osun State, Nigeria. Its headquarters as Abere.

It has an area of 111 km and a population of 83,831 at the 2006 census.

The postal code of the area is 232.

References

Local Government Areas in Osun State
Local Government Areas in Yorubaland